Transfiguration of our Lord Russian Orthodox Church (Holy Transfiguration Church) is a Russian Orthodox church is located in Baltimore, Maryland. The church belongs to the Eastern American diocese of the Russian Orthodox Church Outside Russia.

History
The parish church was founded in 1963 by Vladimir and Anastasia Norko, an immigrant couple, in order to serve the needs of the Russian American immigrant community in Baltimore. Rev. Nikolai Makowelski was the first reverend of the church and served until his retirement in 1984.

The church was served for 12 years by visiting priests from Washington, D.C. For many years the church was in decline, until 1997 when the Reverend Metropolitan Vitaly made the decision to hold services in Old Church Slavonic, and appointed a new rector, Rev. Rostislav Sheniloff to restore the church and parish life. The Rev. Sheniloff faithfully served in the church until his untimely death in 2002, after having succeeded in giving the church a new lease on life. All other churches in Baltimore use English during their services. The use of Old Church Slavonic was meant to appeal to Russian and other Slavic immigrants to Baltimore.

In 2004, the church acquired a new rector, Rev. Ion Barbus, who is still actively serving in the parish.

The iconostasis of the church was painted by the Orthodox priest and artist Theodore Jurewicz, one of the foremost disciples of the renowned Russian Orthodox iconographer abroad, Fr. Cyprian (Pyzhov) of the Holy Trinity Monastery in Jordanville, New York.

References

http://www.holy-transfiguration.org/ourchurch.html

External links
 Official church website
 Parish history

See also
List of churches in Baltimore
Russian Orthodox Church Outside Russia

1963 establishments in Maryland
20th-century Eastern Orthodox church buildings
Butchers Hill, Baltimore
Churches in Baltimore
Eastern Orthodox churches in Maryland
Churches completed in 1963
Christian organizations established in 1963
Russian Orthodox church buildings in the United States
Russian-American culture in Baltimore